"We Were That Song" is a song recorded by Canadian country music artist Brett Kissel for his seventh studio album of the same name (2017). The song was written by Barry Dean, Melissa Peirce, and Jonathan Singleton, while Kissel co-produced the track with Bart McKay and Luke Wooten. Kissel debuted "We Were That Song" at the 2017 Canadian Country Music Association Awards on September 10, 2017 and it was released to digital retailers that evening by BAK 2 BAK Entertainment and Warner Music Canada.

The song reached a peak position of four on the Canada Country chart, earning Kissel his tenth top ten single.

Music video
The accompanying video for "We Were That Song" was directed by Blake McWilliam and premiered September 10, 2017.

Charts

Certifications

References

2017 songs
2017 singles
Brett Kissel songs
Warner Music Group singles
Songs written by Barry Dean (songwriter)
Songs written by Melissa Peirce
Songs written by Jonathan Singleton